Studio FOW (sometimes also stylised as StudioFOW or Studio F.O.W.) is a pornographic production company based in America. Known for the production of animated films featuring video game characters, the studio's content can be described as computer-animated hardcore pornography, often in a high fantasy setting. It is also a video game developer doing business as FOW Interactive (formerly FOW Games).

History 
Founded in 2014 by "Darkcrow", Studio FOW is a crowdfunded group of 3D animators who produce pornographic parodies of popular video games and other media with Source Filmmaker. The group has released several full-length films, alongside other animation shorts, animation loops, and Flash games. Their first major game release, Subverse, received over $2 million from Kickstarter backers within one month in April 2018. Prior to Subverse, their flagship work is the Kunoichi series (a parody of the Ninja Gaiden series). Studio FOW gained notoriety upon creating a parody of Tomb Raider titled Lara in Trouble in 2014. The 17-minute film was distributed on multiple online platforms and attained viral status, leading to a studio expansion. Studio FOW stated that it would not create Overwatch pornography after receiving a cease-and-desist order from Blizzard Entertainment in 2015 for their World of Warcraft-related projects. In December 2018, Studio FOW was permanently banned from the crowdfunding platform Patreon for a sex scene involving a werewolf and a woman.

Major productions

Selected filmography 
Lara in Trouble (Feb. 6, 2014) – featuring Lara Croft
Kunoichi: Broken Princess (Nov. 28, 2014) – featuring Kasumi
Bioshag: Trinity (July 4, 2015) – featuring Elizabeth
Kunoichi 2: Fall of the Shrine Maiden (Nov. 13, 2015) – featuring Kasumi and Momiji
Scarlet Nights (June 28, 2016) – featuring Harley Quinn
Siren's Call (Oct. 16, 2016) – featuring Isabela
Nightmare: Code Valentine (March 1, 2017) – featuring Jill Valentine
Songbird's Shame (June 4, 2017) – featuring Jessica Rabbit
Mila Red Riding Hood (Sept. 5, 2017) – featuring Mila
Nier: First [Ass]embly (Nov. 30, 2017) – featuring 2B
Severance (Feb. 28, 2018) – featuring Helena Douglas
Ghosts of Paradise (June 14, 2018) – featuring Major Motoko Kusanagi
Kunoichi 3: Dark Butterfly (Dec. 14, 2018) – featuring Kasumi, Momiji and Ayane
Jungle Tribal Captive (TBA) – featuring Hitomi and Leifang
Severance 2 (TBA) – featuring Helena Douglas and Kokoro

Video games 
Subverse (March 26, 2021) – original content

References

External links 
 

American pornographic film studios
American erotica and pornography websites
Indie video game developers
Internet properties established in 2014
Video game companies of the United States
Video game companies established in 2014
American companies established in 2014